Gold was first discovered in the Wine Harbour Gold District of Nova Scotia in 1860. Between 1862 and 1907 approximately 42,336.5 troy oz of gold (grading an average of 11.73 g/t) were extracted. The bulk of this extraction was from a series of open pits and underground workings. Historical exploitation of gold via surface pits is rare in Nova Scotia, and it is believed that relatively high grades (perhaps greater than 10g/t Au) were found over significant widths in shallow plunging ore shoots.

Modern exploration in the area has been random and uncoordinated, as many small explorers and prospectors explored individual claims with little reference to past exploration or the competitor's results. Taken as a whole, the body of research covering the district appears to show it has the potential to become a very lucrative prospect for future mineral resource exploration.

Geological and mineralization overview
The Goldenville Formation is folded into two anticlines (the north anticline and the south anticline (the Wine Harbour Anticline)), which converge towards the west. The center of the dome lies in the west end of the gold district. The south anticline is considered to be the main anticline and the north is thought to be a crumple on its north limb. A series of faults radiate on the south-western portion of the district. The veins are interbedded, and most occur on the south limb of the south anticline (Ham, 2000).

The Geological Survey of Canada produced a map of the district that includes quartz leads and slate belts from 1905; it is based on work by Faribault, who spent his life mapping the gold fields of Nova Scotia. It is found on page 16 (included as Figure 5) of the Tri-Explorations Ltd. Engineering Report (Dawe, 1990) and has been retrieved from the Geological Survey of Canada. Boddy's report includes a first-person recount (Boddy, 1991) that there were at least 11 known quartz belts (leads) described as follows:

In 1995, MacNaughton reported, "Native gold occurs in two environments at Wine Harbour, first as native gold in the quartz veins and secondly finer gold associated with the sulfides." (MacNaughton T., 1995, p. 10) In several reports submitted to the Department of Natural Resources, MacNaughton emphasizes that he believes the deposit is similar in structure to that of recent work at Goldboro by Orex and Tangier by Acadian. An assessment report submitted by Gold Bank Resources (McDougall, 1989) for claims to the north and north-west of the district show evidence of additional leads and quartz belts on crown property. However, these are reported to be covered with thick overburden and swamps. Little exploration seems to have occurred in the northern area of the Wine Harbour District.

According to a report by Wilco Mining Company (Hunter, 1989) the Wine Harbour gold mineralization "is associated with sulfinic, arsenical sediments; the sulfides arsenopyrite, chalcopyrite, pyrite, and pyrrhotite are conspicuous, although in general, they  less than 1% of the host rocks. Visible gold is encountered in small milky quartz veinlets which may contain chlorite and carbonate. Highly anomalous values in gold are also known to occur locally within large arsenopyrite porphyroblasts in the host sediments. The old mine workings exploited leads – quartz vein-rich zones in slatey interbeds in the predominant greywacke succession. These slate belts are thin, persistent features that are commonly only one to 5 feet thick and are referred to as belts by past workers.

Acadia Mineral Ventures (AMV) completed extensive exploration work in 1983, 1987 and 1988 in the district. In 1983 five diamond-drill holes were drilled in the district. Details on these holes are unavailable, but from maps in the AMV's 1988 report, they are believed to be shallow. In 1987 and 1988, 38 holes were drilled totaling 18,149 feet of drilling. Gold was found in 26 of 38 holes. All the gold intersections were medium to high-grade and narrow in width. (Black, 1988) Dawe reports that AMV drilled the Greengoods belt and "a number of the holes showed considerable gold mineralization and the geologist on the job stated he had never seen as much gold mineralization and as widespread as he observed in these holes." (Dawe, 1990, p. 4) After reviewing Black's report it is not clear whether Dawe's anecdotal report refers to the Greengoods belt noted on Faribault's plans, or whether the geologist was referring to a series of belts to the west (denoted Murdic, Gillies, McKenzie, and McNaughton on Faribault's plans) which may be a westward extension of the "Greengoods" belt and on which extensive drilling by AMV was undertaken and where good results were obtained. According to AMV's 1988 report, the first eleven holes drilled adjacent "past producers" showed that "no significant results were obtained" (Black, 1988, p. 8).

Paneast Exploration conducted airborne VLF (very low frequency) surveys in 1981 (Broome, 1981). A survey in 1987 by Terraquest Ltd. for Wilco Mining Company (Barrie, 1987) identified "an east-west trend of low resistivity occurs near the highway across the property... The central part of this resistive zone appears to correlate well with the areas of past gold mining in highly silicified argillites."

Other past work in the property's vicinity includes two diamond drill holes targeted at the Plough Lead and grab sampling of the Cameron, McFarlane Leads and a quartz vein at Barachois Point by Durham Resources (Abolins, 1985). To the west, Seabright Resources conducted geochemical soil and till sampling. One sample was reported with 36 ppb gold as an anomaly in its survey (Sexton, 1988).

MacNaughton conducted several placer gold panning samples with positive results in 1995 (MacNaughton T., 1995). The Department of Natural Resources Nova Scan database contains several reports regarding placer gold found in the Wine Harbour district. These reports were not available to the author at the time of writing, but references to the presence of placer gold in several other reports indicated that gold was present in this form (Mills, 1993), (Mills, Paleoplacer Gold Investigation In Nova Scotia, 1993), (Mills, Evaluation of Gold Placer Potential of the Eastern Shore of Nova Scotia, 1992).

In his 1995 report, MacNaughton states "excellent reviews of previous work were done by Derek Johnson in August 1966 and Theodore Koulomzinc in 1966 for Nicholas Onassis". The report (Koulomzine, D., H, & N, 1966) were not obtained or reviewed by the author.

History, past producers and results 
Douglas Boddy included a first-person summary of the history of producers in the area (Boddy, 1991) which described the Plough lead/mine (to the south of the target property) in great detail as well as many of the other past producers and leads/quartz veins in the area. In its 1988 report for the Wilco Mining Company, Jacques Whitford and Associates noted that "these operations ceased production for reasons other than depletion of reserves, such as inefficient mining and milling techniques, no inexpensive readily available source of power, and reports of rich gold and silver deposits in Ontario [that] lured the development capital and skilled labor force away." (Jacques Whitford and Associates Ltd., 1988). The following table of past producers and their results is derived from recent reports on the property for Atlantic Gold NL. (O'Sullivan, 2006) However, Sangster and Smith write "Reliable grade and tonnage figures are not available for the Meguma Group gold deposits." (Sangster & Smith).
						Tons		Ounces		Grade 		g/t 
Napier Mill			1889-1898	36,052		26,104		0.72		22.70
El Dorado Mill			1889-1895	1,144		321		0.28		8.56
Adams Mill			1895-1901	2,297		1,058		0.46		13.86
McNaughton's			1898-1903	1,882		992		0.56		16.07
Guysborough			1899-1900	2,069		817		0.40		12.04
Lowe				1899-1901	6,987		3,395		0.56		15.11
Plough				1902-1904	7,138		2,169		0.30		9.26
Old Provincial Pratt		1900-1902	2,239		450		0.20		6.13
Old Provincial Mining Co.	1903-1905	5,594		1,790		0.30		9.76
Wine Harbour Gold Mine Co.	1906-1907	7,191		1,431		0.20		6.07
Mineral Industries Ltd.		1936-1939	6,456		2,014		0.31		9.51
MacNaughton and Mazerolle stated that "[...] an exploration program by Mineral Industries Limited bulk sampled some of the old workings. From the Plough Belt, 7,663 tons were mined. 5,655 tons milled yielding a recovery of about .175 oz/ton with recoveries ranging from 67% to 93.4%." (MacNaughton T., 1995, p. 8) They continued that "the grade calculated by Mineral Industries Limited from recovered gold indicates a minimum tenor [sic] of 0.18 oz/ton. Modern recovery methods should be able to raise this value at least 10% and very likely 17% (giving 97% recovery) or about 0.213 oz/ton." (MacNaughton T., 1995, p. 10)

Figure 3 below illustrates the known location of historic workings and some details of modern exploration work. At least 43 Diamond Drill Core samples taken by Acadia Mineral Ventures are not included in this data set, nor are Reverse Circulation and RAB drilling by Atlantic Gold. The database includes only one past producer is included when Faribault's map of the district show at least four distinct producing facilities in 1905.

The Nova Scan database contains a reference to a report on a Bulk Sample conducted in 1993 by Cole, but at the time of writing this report had not been reviewed. (Cole, 1993)

A plan of the district is also included in the Prospectus of the Eureka Gold Mining Company from 1868. At the time of writing this report, it had not been reviewed. (Eureka Gold Mining Company, 1868) (Eureka Gold Mining Company, 1868)

References 

(1911). Retrieved from http://www.gov.ns.ca/nsarm/virtual/meninmines/archives.asp?ID=300
(2009, October 31). Retrieved December 28, 2009, from The Nova Scotia Mineral Occurrence Database: http://www.gov.ns.ca/natr/meb/links/modblinks.asp
Abolins, U. (1985, June 5). Retrieved December 28, 2009, from Nova Scan Database, Department of Natural Resources, Government of Nova Scotia: http://www.gov.ns.ca/natr/meb/data/ar/1985/AR_ME_1985-035.pdf
Atlantic Gold NL. (2007, July 31). Retrieved December 28, 2009, from http://www.asx.com.au/asxpdf/20070731/pdf/313qlv8gg02dv4.pdf
Barrie, C. (1987, August 18). Retrieved December 28, 2009, from Nova Scan Database, Department of Natural Resources, Government of Nova Scotia: http://www.gov.ns.ca/natr/meb/data/ar/1987/ar_me_1987-214.pdf
Black, D. L. (1988, August 8). Retrieved December 28, 2009, from Nova Scan Database, Department of Natural Resources, Government of Nova Scotia: http://www.gov.ns.ca/natr/meb/data/ar/1988/ar_me_1988-284.pdf
Boddy, D. (1991, August 6). Retrieved December 27, 2009, from Nova Scan Database, Department of Natural Resources, Government of Nova Scotia: http://www.gov.ns.ca/natr/meb/data/ar/1991/ar_me_1991-101.pdf
Broome, H. J. (1981). Report on Airborne Geophysical Surveys on Behalf of Paneast Exploration Limited In Southeastern Nova Scotia. Sander Geophysics Ltd.
Cole, C. D. (1993). Initial Technical Evaluation of an Agglomeration/Vat Leaching Process for Recovery of Gold from Ore Sample WH-Bulk*1. Halifax: Technical University of Nova Scotia.
Dawe, J. (1990, July 31). Retrieved December 27, 2009, from Nova Scan Database, Department of Natural Resources, Government of Nova Scotia: http://www.gov.ns.ca/natr/meb/data/ar/1990/ar_me_1990-082.pdf
Eureka Gold Mining Company. (1868). Retrieved December 2009, 2009, from https://archive.org/details/cihm_02922
Eureka Gold Mining Company. (1868). The prospectus, reports, and statistics of the Eureka Gold Mining Company of Nova Scotia [microform] : with a plan of the Wine Harbour Gold District : limited liability, capital stock, $100,000 in 100,000 shares of $1 each : to be organized under a special cha. Toronto: The Company.
Faribault, E. R. (1905). Natural Resources Canada. Retrieved from MIRAGE - Map Image Rendering Database for Geoscience: http://apps1.gdr.nrcan.gc.ca/mirage/mirage_list_e.php?id=108146
Ham, L. (2000). Retrieved December 27, 2009, from Nova Scan Database, Department of Natural Resources, Government of Nova Scotia: http://www.gov.ns.ca/natr/meb/pdf/01re01/01re01_05ham.pdf
Hunter, D. (1989, May 15). Retrieved December 27, 2009, from Nova Scan Database, Department of Natural Resources, Government of Nova Scotia: http://www.gov.ns.ca/natr/meb/data/ar/1989/ar_me_1989-157.pdf
Jaques Whitford and Associates Ltd. (1988, July 22). Retrieved December 27, 2009, from Nova Scan Database, Department of Natural Resources, Government of Nova Scotia: http://www.gov.ns.ca/natr/meb/data/ar/1988/ar_me_1988-260.pdf
Koulomzine, T., D., J., H, M. J., & N, O. (1966). Gold, Wine Harbour, Guysborough County, Nova Scotia. Report on Geology and Rock Geochemistry. 
MacNaughton, T. (1995, September 18). Retrieved December 28, 2009, from http://www.gov.ns.ca/natr/meb/data/ar/1995/ar_me_1995-077.pdf
MacNaughton, T. (1996, February 17). Retrieved December 27, 2009, from Nova Scan Database, Department of Natural Resources, Government of Nova Scotia: http://www.gov.ns.ca/natr/meb/data/ar/1996/ar_me_1996-016.pdf
MacNaughton, T. (2004, February 17). Retrieved December 2009, 2009, from Nova Scan Database, Department of Natural Resources, Government of Nova Scotia: http://www.gov.ns.ca/natr/meb/data/ar/2004/ar_me_2004-047.pdf
MacNaughton, T. (2005, February 17). Retrieved December 27, 2009, from Nova Scan Database, Department of Natural Resources, Government of Nova Scotia: http://www.gov.ns.ca/natr/meb/data/ar/2005/ar_me_2005-052.pdf
McDougall, K. (1989, March 22). Retrieved December 27, 2009, from Nova Scan Database, Department of Natural Resources, Government of Nova Scotia: http://www.gov.ns.ca/natr/meb/data/ar/1989/ar_me_1989-118.pdf
Mills, R. (1992). Evaluation of Gold Placer Potential of the Eastern Shore of Nova Scotia. Halifax: Nova Scotia Department of Natural Resources.
Mills, R. (1993). Paleoplacer Gold Investigation In Nova Scotia. Halifax: Nova Scotia Department of Natural Resources.
Mills, R. (1993). Placer Gold Potential In Nova Scotia. Halifax: Nova Scotia Department of Natural Resources.
Mineral Industries Limited. (1937). Retrieved from Nova Scan Database, Department of Natural Resources, Government of Nova Scotia: http://www.gov.ns.ca/natr/meb/download/mg/ofm/htm/ofm_1937-011.asp
MLS Listing #37508470. (December 11, 2009). Retrieved 27 2009, December, from Multiple Listing Service: http://www.realtor.ca/PropertyDetails.aspx?PropertyID=8052419
Nova Scotia Archives & Records Management. (1937). Retrieved from http://www.gov.ns.ca/nsarm/virtual/meninmines/archives.asp?ID=314
NSARM Photo Collection: Places: Wine Harbour no.2. (1937). Nova Scotia Archives & Records Management. Retrieved December 28, 2009, from http://www.gov.ns.ca/nsarm/virtual/meninmines/archives.asp?ID=313
Oicle, G. (1999, February 2). Retrieved December 27, 2009, from Nova Scan Database, Department of Natural Resources, Government of Nova Scotia: http://www.gov.ns.ca/natr/meb/data/ar/1999/ar_me_1999-009.pdf
Oicle, G. (2000, January 28). Retrieved December 27, 2009, from Nova Scan Database, Department of Natural Resources, Government of Nova Scotia: http://www.gov.ns.ca/natr/meb/data/ar/2000/ar_me_2000-010.pdf
O'Neil, P. (n.d.). Pin Services Ltd. Retrieved 28 2009, December, from http://www.pin.ca/maritimes/06-0237/index.htm
O'Sullivan, J. (2006, February). Retrieved December 27, 2009, from Department of Natural Resources, Nova Scan Database, Government of Nova Scotia: http://www.gov.ns.ca/natr/meb/data/ar/2006/ar_me_2006-025.pdf
Sangster, A., & Smith, P. (n.d.). Retrieved from Geological Survey of Canada, Natural Resources Canada: http://gsc.nrcan.gc.ca/mindep/metallogeny/gold/meguma/index_e.php
Sexton, A. J. (1988, January). Retrieved December 28, 2009, from Nova Scan Database, Department of Natural Resources, Government of Nova Scotia: http://www.gov.ns.ca/natr/meb/data/ar/1988/ar_me_1988-036.pdf
Utley, J. (2006, December). Retrieved December 27, 2009, from Department of Natural Resources, Nova Scan Database, Government of Nova Scotia: http://www.gov.ns.ca/natr/meb/data/ar/2007/ar_me_2007-014.pdf
Utley, J. (2006, December). Retrieved December 27, 2009, from Nova Scan Database, Department of Natural Resources, Government of Nova Scotia:

Geography of Nova Scotia
Mining in Nova Scotia